Julien Guerrier (born 1 July 1985) is a French professional golfer who plays on the European Tour. He won the 2006 Amateur Championship.

Amateur career
Guerrier was born in Évreux. He had a successful amateur career, which included winning The Amateur Championship in 2006 at Royal St George's Golf Club. He turned professional after competing in the 2007 Masters Tournament.

Professional career
Guerrier finished third on the Alps Tour Order of Merit in 2008 to graduate to the second tier Challenge Tour for 2009. He again progressed, finishing 16th on the 2009 Challenge Tour Rankings to earn a European Tour card for 2010, although he later improved his exemption category at qualifying school, recording a record low round of 60 in the process. He failed to retain his card after the 2010 European Tour and returned to the Challenge Tour for 2011. At the end of 2011 he qualified to play on the European Tour for 2012, but failed to retain his card for a second time.

After a number of season on the Challenge Tour, Guerrier has his first successes in 2017, winning the Hauts de France Golf Open and the Irish Challenge. Finishing 6th in the Order of Merit he returned to the European Tour for 2018. Guerrier had a good start to 2018, finishing third in the Oman Open. He finished 2018 at 86th in the money list to retain his card for 2019. Guerrier missed most of 2019 through injury, only returning in September.

Amateur wins
2006 The Amateur Championship

Professional wins (5)

Challenge Tour wins (2)

Challenge Tour playoff record (0–2)

Alps Tour wins (2)

French Tour wins (1)

Results in major championships

CUT = missed the half-way cut
"T" = tied

Team appearances
Amateur
European Boys' Team Championship (representing France): 2002
European Youths' Team Championship (representing France): 2004, 2006

Eisenhower Trophy (representing France): 2004, 2006
European Amateur Team Championship (representing France): 2005
Bonallack Trophy (representing Europe): 2006 (winners)
St Andrews Trophy (representing the Continent of Europe): 2006

See also
2009 Challenge Tour graduates
2009 European Tour Qualifying School graduates
2011 European Tour Qualifying School graduates
2017 Challenge Tour graduates

References

External links

French male golfers
European Tour golfers
Sportspeople from Évreux
Sportspeople from La Rochelle
1985 births
Living people
21st-century French people